The School of Veterinary Medicine at the University of Glasgow is one of nine veterinary schools in the United Kingdom, and offers undergraduate and postgraduate qualifications in Veterinary Medicine.

It was established in 1862 as the independent Glasgow Veterinary College, being subsumed into the university in 1949 and gaining independent faculty status in 1969. In 2010 it became a constituent school of the new College of Medical, Veterinary and Life Sciences. It ranked second in the UK by the Complete University Guide 2016 and in 2015, QS World University Rankings ranked the veterinary school seventh in the world for veterinary medicine.

Early days
In 1859, James McCall, Professor of Anatomy and Physiology at the Dick Veterinary College in Edinburgh, moved to Glasgow and started a practice in Hope Street, from which he gave informal lectures in veterinary medicine. In 1862, formal classes were instituted and the practice moved to a larger accommodation, a set of stables at 397 Parliamentary Road.

In 1863, a royal warrant was issued which established McCall's enterprise as the Glasgow Veterinary College and entitled its students to examination at the Royal College of Veterinary Surgeons; the first graduate qualified in 1865. The college was the second veterinary school in Scotland, after the Dick School in Edinburgh, McCall's alma mater, which was established in 1823. In 1873, it moved to much larger facilities in Buccleuch Street, a former pumping station, and merged into the University of Glasgow in 1949. The current Vet School was built on the Garscube Estate in 1970.

Facilities
The school is now based at the Garscube Estate in Bearsden, on the outskirts of Glasgow, purchased by the university in 1948 from Sir George Campbell of Succoth. Sir George was a descendant of Ilay Campbell, Lord Succoth, who had studied Law at the university and later served as Lord President of the Court of Session and rector of the university. The main Garscube House had been used as a hospital during the Second World War. The school has a farm, a small-animal hospital and an equine hospital on the estate, as well as the James Herriot Library, named for Alf Wight, a graduate of the school who wrote under that name. The university's Wolfson Halls are also situated on the estate, as is the Garscube Sports Complex, used by the school's student rugby team as well as other students and sports clubs in the university.

The school also has facilities on the Cochno Estate, purchased by the university in 1954. Cochno was formerly the seat of the Hamiltons of Barnes, but during the late nineteenth century, the Estate was home to William Anderson Donaldson, a Glasgow iron merchant of the firm, James Watson & Company.

Degree
The school presents students for the degree of Bachelor of Veterinary Medicine and Surgery (BVMS). This is one of only six degree programmes in Europe recognised by the American Veterinary Medical Association, and is one of a small number recognised automatically by the South African Veterinary Council.

The school scored 95% for 'graduate prospects' and 5B for 'research quality' in The Times Good University Guide 2009.

Notable alumni and staff

Notable alumni
 Laura Muir, veterinary surgeon and middle/long distance olympic athlete
 Mark Bryan, veterinarian working in New Zealand
 Michael Findlay, veterinary surgeon, author and broadcaster
 John A. Gilruth, former Administrator of the Northern Territory of Australia
 James Herriot, veterinary surgeon and author (real name Alf Wight) 
 Manda Scott, writer
 Eddie Straiton, veterinary surgeon, author and television presenter known as "the TV Vet"
 David Taylor, veterinary surgeon, founder of IZVG, author and television presenter known as "The Zoo Vet"

Notable staff
Sir James Whyte Black (1924–2010), Nobel laureate, lecturer at the university's Veterinary School during the 1950s
 Professor Andrea Nolan, first woman dean of a British vet school

References

Glasgow
Veterinary
Glasgow
1862 establishments in Scotland